Kodad is a town in Suryapet district of the Indian state of Telangana. It is a municipality and the mandal headquarters of Kodad mandal in Kodad revenue division. It lies on the National Highway 65 between Hyderabad and Vijayawada. It is 44 km away from the district headquarters Suryapet

Climate 
Kodad summer highest day temperature is in between 35 °C to 48 °C . 
Average temperatures of January is 24 °C, February is 26 °C, March is 29 °C, April is 33 °C, May is 36 °C .

Transport 

TSRTC operates several buses from Kodad to various destinations in Andhra Pradesh and Telangana.

Demographics 
According to Census of India, 2011, population of Kodad town is 65,234 of which 32,010 are male and 33,224 are female. The literacy rate of the town is 96.7%.  Sex ratio is 1060 females to 1000 males. Child sex ratio is 1100 girls to 1000 boys.

Kodad Mandal has a population of 134,130, of which 66,604 are male and 67,526 are female. The literacy rate is 94.33%.

Governance

Civic administration

Kodad Municipality is the civic administrative body of the town which was constituted in the year 2011. The present municipal commissioner is L.Balojinaik and the chairman is vanaparthi sirisha.

Politics
 
Kodad town under Kodad mandal falls under Kodad (Assembly constituency) of Telangana Legislative Assembly. B.Mallaiah Yadav is the present MLA of the constituency from Telangana Rashtra Samithi.

See also 

Suryapet
Huzurnagar

References

Cities and towns in Suryapet district
Mandal headquarters in Suryapet district